, also called , was the 122nd emperor of Japan according to the traditional order of succession. Reigning from 13 February 1867 to his death, he was the first monarch of the Empire of Japan and presided over the Meiji era. He was the figurehead of the Meiji Restoration, a series of rapid changes that witnessed Japan's transformation from an isolationist, feudal state to an industrialized world power.

At the time of Emperor Meiji's birth in 1852, Japan was a feudal pre-industrial country dominated by the isolationist Tokugawa shogunate and the daimyō subject to it, who ruled over the country's 270 decentralized domains. By the time of his death, Japan had undergone an extensive political, economic, and social revolution and emerged as one of the great powers on the world stage. The New York Times summarized this transformation at the emperor's funeral in 1912: "the contrast between that which preceded the funeral car and that which followed it was striking indeed. Before it went old Japan; after it came new Japan."

Since the modern era, when an emperor of Japan dies, he is given a posthumous name. Such a name is a combination of the era during which he reigned and coincides with the emperor's contribution to the throne while he was alive. Therefore, he was publicly known during his life merely as "The Emperor", but he has been historically known as "Emperor Meiji" after his death. He obtained the current title in reference to the Meiji era, which spanned almost the entirety of his reign. He was also the first emperor to reign under the "one emperor, one era name"-system (一世一元), under which an era ends only on emperor's death or abdication, whereas before, an era could change mid-reign after a significant event, such as a disaster.

Background 

The Tokugawa shogunate had established itself in the early 17th century. Under its rule, the shōgun governed Japan. About 180 lords, known as daimyōs, ruled autonomous realms under the shōgun, and occasionally the shōgun called upon the daimyōs for gifts but did not tax them. The shōgun controlled the daimyōs in other ways too; only the shōgun could approve daimyōs marriages, and the shōgun could divest a daimyō of his lands.

Tokugawa Ieyasu, who had officially retired from his position by 1605, was the first Tokugawa shōgun. Upon retirement, Tokugawa Ieyasu and his son Tokugawa Hidetada, the titular shōgun, issued a code of behavior for the nobility in 1605. Under the code, the Emperor was required to devote his time to scholarship and the arts. The Emperors under the shogunate appear to have adhered closely to this code by studying Confucian classics and devoting time to poetry and calligraphy. Emperors were taught only the rudiments of Japanese and Chinese history and geography. The shōgun did not seek the consent or advice of the Emperor for his actions.

Emperors almost never left their palace compound, or Gosho in Kyoto, except after an Emperor retired or to take shelter in a temple if the palace caught on fire. Few Emperors lived long enough to retire; of the Meiji Emperor's five predecessors, only his grandfather and great-grandfather lived beyond the age of 40. The Imperial Family suffered very high rates of infant mortality; all five of the Emperor's brothers and sisters died as infants, and only five of his own 15 children reached adulthood.

Soon after taking control in the early seventeenth century, shogunate officials (known generically as bakufu) ended almost all Western trade with Japan, and barred Christian missionaries from the islands under the Sakoku Edict of 1635. In addition to the substantial Chinese trade, only the Dutch continued trade with Japan, maintaining a post on the island of Dejima by Nagasaki. However, by the early 19th century, European and American vessels appeared in the waters around Japan with increasing frequency.

Consanguineous marriages are common in the early history of Japanese upper class as a way to protect the ideal or royal bloodline; however, this came with unexpected consequences. Unknown to him at the time, Meiji also had hereditary diseases that were the result of inbreeding. These genetic defects included but were not limited to mandibular prognathism and spinal deformation, which could also be found in his children.

Apart from the congenital diseases, Meiji also suffered from beriberi caused by malnutrition, particularly a deficiency of thiamine (vitamin B1). The imperial family had a poorer diet than that of average people due to religious reasons. Due to beriberi, he could barely walk.

He had fifteen children with his concubines. Ten of them died prematurely. Prince Yoshihito (later Emperor Taishō) was the only male heir who reached adulthood, but his body and mind were weak, and suffered from meningitis, diabetes, cerebral thrombosis and mental illness. Emperor Meiji was known to not only dearly love his grandchildren, but to be fond of the son of Gojong of Korea, the last crown prince of Korea, Yi Un.

Early life
Prince Mutsuhito was born on 3 November 1852 in a small house on his maternal grandfather's property at the north end of the Gosho. At the time, birth was culturally believed to be a source of pollution, so the imperial prince was not born in the Palace. Instead, it was common for members of the Imperial Family to be born in a structure, often temporary, near the pregnant woman's father's house. The Prince Mutsuhito's mother, Nakayama Yoshiko, was a concubine to his father Emperor Kōmei, and she was the daughter of the acting major counselor, Nakayama Tadayasu. The young prince was given the title Sachi-no-miya, or Prince Sachi.

The young prince was born into an era of great change in Japan. This change was symbolised dramatically in July 1853 when Commodore Matthew Perry and his American Naval squadron (what the Japanese dubbed "the Black Ships"), sailed into the harbour at Edo (known since 1868 as Tokyo). Perry sought to open Japan up to international trade and warned the Japanese of military consequences if they did not agree. For the first time in at least 250 years, the shogunate took the highly unusual step of consulting with the Imperial Court because of the crisis brought on by Perry's arrival. Emperor Kōmei's officials advised that they felt they should agree to trade with the Americans and asked that they be informed in advance of any steps to be taken upon Perry's return. The Japanese government decided that their military was no match for the American military and thus allowed trade and submitted to what it dubbed the "Unequal Treaties". "Unequal Treaties" meant giving up tariff authority and the right to try foreigners in its own courts. The shogunate's willingness to consult with the Court was short-lived: in 1858, word of a treaty arrived with a letter stating that due to shortness of time, it had not been possible to consult. Emperor Kōmei was so incensed that he threatened to abdicate—though even this action would have required the consent of the shōgun.

Much of the Emperor's boyhood is known only through later accounts, which his biographer Donald Keene points out are often contradictory. One contemporary described Mutsuhito as healthy and strong, somewhat of a bully, and exceptionally talented at sumo. Another states that the prince was delicate and often ill. Some biographers state that he fainted when he first heard gunfire, while others deny this account. On 16 August 1860, Sachinomiya was proclaimed prince of the blood and heir to the throne and was formally adopted by his father's consort. Later that year on 11 November, he was proclaimed as the crown prince and given an adult name, Mutsuhito. The prince began his education at the age of seven. He proved an indifferent student, and later in life wrote poems regretting that he had not applied himself more in writing practice.

Reign

Unrest and accession

By the early 1860s, the shogunate was under several threats. Representatives of foreign powers sought to increase their influence in Japan. Many daimyōs were increasingly dissatisfied with bakufu handling foreign affairs. Large numbers of young samurai, known as shishi or "men of high purpose", began to meet and speak against the shogunate. The shishi revered Emperor Kōmei and favoured direct violent action to cure societal ills. While they initially desired the death or expulsion of all foreigners, the shishi would later begin to advocate the modernisation of the country.  The bakufu enacted several measures to appease the various groups in an effort to drive a wedge between the shishi and daimyōs.

Kyoto was a major centre for the shishi and the shishi had influence over the Emperor Kōmei. In 1863, the shishi persuaded him to issue an "Order to expel barbarians". The Order placed the shogunate in a difficult position since they had no intention of enforcing the order because they did not have the power to carry it out. Several attacks were made on foreigners or their ships, and foreign forces retaliated. Bakufu forces were able to drive most of the shishi out of Kyoto, and an attempt by them to return in 1864 was driven back. Nevertheless, unrest continued throughout Japan.

The prince's awareness of the political turmoil is uncertain. During this time, he studied waka poetry, first with his father, then with the court poets. In 1866, a new shōgun, Tokugawa Yoshinobu, took office as the prince continued his classical education. Tokugawa Yoshinobu was a reformer who desired to transform Japan into a Western-style state. Yoshinobu was the final shōgun and met with resistance from among the bakufu, even as unrest and military actions continued. In mid-1866, a bakufu army set forth to punish rebels in southern Japan.  The army was defeated.

Emperor Kōmei fell seriously ill at the age of 36 and died on 30 January 1867. British diplomat Sir Ernest Satow wrote, "it is impossible to deny that [Emperor Kōmei's] disappearance from the political scene, leaving as his successor a boy of fifteen or sixteen [actually fourteen], was most opportune".

In a brief ceremony in Kyoto, the crown prince formally ascended to the throne on 3 February 1867.  The new Emperor continued his classical education, which did not include matters of politics. In the meantime, the shōgun, Yoshinobu, struggled to maintain power. He repeatedly asked for the Emperor's confirmation of his actions, which he eventually received, but there is no indication that the young Emperor was himself involved in the decisions. The shishi and other rebels continued to shape their vision of the new Japan, and although they revered the Emperor, they had no thought of having him play an active part in the political process.

The political struggle reached its climax in late 1867. An agreement was reached by which Yoshinobu would maintain his title and some of his power, but the lawmaking power would be vested in a bicameral legislature based on the British model. The agreement fell apart and on 9 November 1867, Yoshinobu officially tendered his resignation to the Emperor and formally stepped down ten days later. The following month, the rebels marched on Kyoto, taking control of the Imperial Palace.  On 4 January 1868, the Emperor ceremoniously read out a document before the court proclaiming the "restoration" of Imperial rule, and the following month, documents were sent to foreign powers:

The Emperor of Japan announces to the sovereigns of all foreign countries and to their subjects that permission has been granted to the shōgun Tokugawa Yoshinobu to return the governing power in accordance with his own request. We shall henceforward exercise supreme authority in all the internal and external affairs of the country. Consequently, the title of Emperor must be substituted for that of Tycoon, in which the treaties have been made. Officers are being appointed by us to the conduct of foreign affairs. It is desirable that the representatives of the treaty powers recognize this announcement.Mutsuhito

On 23 October 1868 the era was changed from Keiō to Meiji, or "enlightened rule", which was later used for the Emperor's posthumous name. This marked the beginning of the custom of posthumously naming the Emperor after the era during which he ruled.

In a conflict known as the Boshin War, Yoshinobu's followers briefly resisted and bakufu holdouts were finally defeated in late 1869.

Consolidation of power

Despite the ouster of the bakufu, no effective central government had been put in place by the rebels. On March 23 the Dutch Minister-Resident Dirk de Graeff van Polsbroek and the French Minister-Resident Léon Roches were the first European envoys ever to receive a personal audience with the new Emperor Meiji in Edo (Tokyo). This audience laid the foundation for (modern) Dutch diplomacy in Japan. Subsequently, De Graeff van Polsbroek assisted the emperor and the government in their negotiations with representatives of the major European powers. On 7 April 1868, the Emperor was presented with the Charter Oath, a five-point statement of the nature of the new government. The statement was designed to win over those who had not yet committed themselves to the new regime. This document, which the Emperor then formally promoted, abolished feudalism and proclaimed a modern democratic government for Japan. The Charter Oath would later be cited by Emperor Shōwa in the Humanity Declaration as support for the imposed changes in Japanese government following World War II. For the first time since early childhood, he left the Imperial precincts in Kyoto in mid-May to take command of the forces pursuing the remnants of the bakufu armies. Traveling in slow stages due to through roads being lined with crowds, he took three days to travel from Kyoto to Osaka. There was no conflict in Osaka; the new leaders wanted the Emperor to be more visible to his people and to foreign envoys. At the end of May, after two weeks in Osaka (in a much less formal atmosphere than in Kyoto), the Emperor returned to his home. Shortly after his return, it was announced that the Emperor would begin to preside over all state business, reserving further literary study for his leisure time. Only from 1871 onward did the Emperor's studies include materials on contemporary affairs.

On 19 September 1868, the Emperor announced the name of the city of Edo was to be changed to Tokyo, meaning "eastern capital". He was formally crowned in Kyoto on 15 October (a ceremony which had been postponed from the previous year due to the civil unrest). Shortly before the coronation, he announced that the new era, or nengō, would be called Meiji or "enlightened rule". Heretofore the nengō had often been changed multiple times in an Emperor's reign; from now on, it was announced, there would only be one nengō per reign.

Soon after his coronation, the Emperor journeyed to Tokyo by road, visiting it for the first time. He arrived in late November and began an extended stay by distributing sake among the population. The population of Tokyo was eager for an Imperial visit. Tokyo had been the site of the shōguns court and the city's population feared that with the abolition of the shogunate, the city might fall into decline. It would not be until 1889 that a final decision was made to move the capital to Tokyo. While in Tokyo, the Emperor boarded a Japanese naval vessel for the first time, and the following day gave instructions for studies to see how Japan's navy could be strengthened. Soon after his return to Kyoto, a rescript was issued in the Emperor's name (but most likely written by court officials). It indicated his intent to be involved in government affairs. And indeed he attended cabinet meetings and innumerable other government functions, though rarely speaking, almost until the day of his death.

Political reform

The successful revolutionaries organized themselves into a Council of State, and subsequently into a system where three main ministers led the government. This structure would last until the establishment of a prime minister, who would lead a cabinet in a western fashion, in 1885. Initially, not even the retention of the Emperor was certain; revolutionary leader Gotō Shōjirō later stated that some officials "were afraid the extremists might go further and abolish the Mikado". Japan's new leaders sought to reform the patchwork system of domains governed by the daimyōs. In 1869, several of the daimyōs who had supported the revolution gave their land property to the Emperor and were reappointed as governors, with considerable salaries. By the following year, all other daimyōs had followed suit.

In 1871, as Japan was organized into 72 prefectures the Emperor announced that domains were entirely abolished. The daimyōs were compensated with annual salaries equal to ten percent of their former revenues (from which they now did not have to deduct the cost of governing), but were required to move to the new capital, Tokyo. Most daimyōs retired from politics.

The new administration gradually abolished most privileges of the samurai, including their right to a stipend from the government. However, unlike the daimyōs, many samurai suffered financially from this change. Most other class-based distinctions were abolished. Legalized discrimination against the burakumin ended. However, these classes continue to suffer discrimination in Japan to the present time.

The 1889 constitution created a new parliament, although it had no real power. Power had passed from the Tokugawa into the hands of those daimyōs and other samurai who had led the Restoration. Japan was thus controlled by the Genrō, an oligarchy which comprised the most powerful men of the military, political and economic spheres. The Emperor showed greater political longevity than his recent predecessors, as he was the first Japanese monarch to remain on the throne past the age of 50 since Emperor Ōgimachi's abdication from the throne in 1586.

The Japanese take pride in the Meiji Restoration, as it and the accompanying industrialization allowed Japan to become the preeminent power in the Pacific and a major player in the world within a generation. Yet, Emperor Meiji's role in the Restoration, as well as the amount of personal authority and influence he wielded during his reign, remains debatable. He kept no diary, wrote almost no letters (unlike his father) and left "no more than three or four" photographs.  The accounts of people who had met or were close to him usually contain little substantial information or are mutually contradictory.

Due to the lack of reliable sources of the period, mysteries surrounding Emperor Meiji's personality and role in the Restoration remain a matter of historical dispute. James C. Baxter argues that the Emperor was a figurehead without real power who rarely interfered with what had been agreed upon in advance by the Meiji oligarchy. Conversely, Herbert Bix describes Meiji as a powerful autocrat whom the Genrō struggled to restrain while accommodating his anti-democratic inclinations. R.Starr characterizes Meiji as a highly individualistic and forthright person who was no puppet to any group in his government, and although progressive, not 'liberal' or 'democratic'.  Yet another group of historians contend he was never a full dictator, but remain divided on whether his personal power was "far closer to the absolutist end" or he merely played a mediating role in the Genrō's decisionmaking.

He composed the following poem in waka form:

Yomo no umi
mina harakara to 
omofu yo ni
nado namikaze no 
tachi sawaguramu

The seas of the four directions—
all are born of one womb:
why, then, do the wind and waves rise in discord?

This poem was later recited by his grandson, Emperor Shōwa in an Imperial Conference in September 1941 before the attack on Pearl Harbor to tell that he wanted to avoid the war.

The Illustrated London News published an article with a cover illustration of Emperor Meiji in the New-York Tribune on 19 March 1905. The description text said:

The victorious Emperor of Japan - beloved ruler of a new world power. The Emperor, who was born on 3 November 1852, succeeded to the throne on 3 February 1867, on the suppression of the Shogun dynasty, which had for generations wielded the power which the imperial family held only in name. Mutsuhito has proved the most practical of modern monarchs, for in less than forty years he has brought his country from semi-barbarism to the status of a first class power.

Senior life and death

Near the end of his life several leftists, including Shūsui Kōtoku, were executed (1911) on charges of having conspired to murder the sovereign. This conspiracy was known as the High Treason Incident (1910).

Emperor Meiji, suffering from diabetes, nephritis, and gastroenteritis, died of uremia. Although the official announcement said he died at 00:42 on 30 July 1912, the actual death was at 22:40 on 29 July. He was succeeded by his eldest son, Emperor Taishō.

By 1912, Japan had gone through a political, economic, and social revolution and emerged as one of the great powers in the world. The New York Times summed up this transformation at the Emperor's funeral in 1912 as: "the contrast between that which preceded the funeral car and that which followed it was striking indeed. Before it went old Japan; after it came new Japan."

After the Emperor's death in 1912, the Japanese Diet passed a resolution to commemorate his role in the Meiji Restoration. An iris garden in an area of Tokyo where Emperor Meiji and the Empress had been known to visit was chosen as the building's location for the Shinto shrine Meiji Jingū. The shrine does not contain the Emperor's grave, which is at Fushimi-momoyama south of Kyoto.

Family and issue                             

Soon after Meiji's ascension, the Emperor's officials presented Ichijō Haruko to him as a possible bride. The future Empress was the daughter of an Imperial official, and was three years older than the groom, who would have to wait to wed until after his genpuku (manhood ceremony). The two married on 11 January 1869. Known posthumously as Empress Dowager Shōken, she was the first Imperial Consort to receive the title of kōgō (literally, the Emperor's wife, translated as Empress Consort), in several hundred years. Although she was the first Japanese Empress Consort to play a public role, she bore no children. However, the Meiji Emperor had fifteen children by five official ladies-in-waiting. Only five of his children, a prince born to Lady Naruko (1855–1943), the daughter of Yanagiwara Mitsunaru, and four princesses born to Lady Sachiko (1867–1947), the eldest daughter of Count Sono Motosachi, lived to adulthood. Although Meiji was the last Emperor to have concubines, this function was not officially abolished until 1924.

Spouse

Concubines

Issue
Emperor Meiji had fifteen children (five sons and ten daughters), five of them (a son and four daughters) reached adulthood. 

He had eighteen grandchildren (eleven grandsons and seven granddaughters).

Honours

National honours
 Founder and Sovereign of the Order of the Rising Sun, 10 April 1875
 Founder and Sovereign of the Order of the Chrysanthemum, 27 December 1876
 Founder and Sovereign of the Order of Meiji, 4 January 1888
 Founder and Sovereign of the Order of the Paulownia Flowers, 4 January 1888
 Founder and Sovereign of the Order of the Precious Crown, 4 January 1888
 Founder and Sovereign of the Order of the Golden Kite, 12 February 1890

Foreign honours

He received the following orders and decorations:
   Austria-Hungary: Grand Cross of the Royal Hungarian Order of St. Stephen, 16 May 1881
 : Grand Cordon of the Order of Leopold, 20 November 1880
 : Knight of the Order of the Elephant, 18 May 1887
 : Grand Cross of the National Order of the Legion of Honour, 20 March 1883
 : Knight of the Order of the Black Eagle, 29 May 1879; with Collar, 10 June 1895
 : Knight of the Royal Order of St. Hubert, 1894
 : Grand Cross of the Order of Henry the Lion, 18 June 1907
    Ernestine duchies: Grand Cross of the Saxe-Ernestine House Order, 1873
  Mecklenburg: Grand Cross of the House Order of the Wendish Crown, with Crown in Ore and Collar, 2 February 1885
 : Grand Cross of the Order of the White Falcon, 27 December 1882
 : Grand Cross of the Order of the Württemberg Crown, 23 December 1896
  Kingdom of Greece: Grand Cross of the Order of the Redeemer, 13 May 1891
 : Grand Cross of the Order of Kamehameha I, with Collar, 15 March 1881
 :
 Knight of the Supreme Order of the Most Holy Annunciation, 26 July 1879
 Grand Cross of the Order of Saints Maurice and Lazarus, 26 July 1879
 Grand Cross of the Order of the Crown of Italy, 26 July 1879
 : Collar of the Order of the Golden Ruler, 5 September 1900
 : Grand Cross of the Order of Prince Danilo I, 18 February 1885
 : Grand Cross of the Order of the Netherlands Lion, 26 July 1881
 : Order of Distinction, 13 June 1890
 : Grand Cross of the Sash of the Three Orders, 16 April 1904
 : Order of the Double Dragon, Grade I Class I, 20 December 1898
 : Knight of the Order of Saint Andrew the Apostle the First-called, 5 September 1879
 : Knight of the Order of the Golden Fleece, 14 November 1883
  Siam: Knight of the Order of the Royal House of Chakri, 22 December 1887 
   Sweden-Norway: Knight of the Royal Order of the Seraphim, 11 December 1881
 : Stranger Knight of the Most Noble Order of the Garter, 15 May 1906

Timeline and gallery

The Meiji era ushered in many far-reaching changes to the ancient feudal society of Japan. A timeline of major events might include:

3 November 1852: Emperor Meiji (then known as the Prince Mutsuhito Sachinomiya) is born to the imperial concubine Nakayama Yoshiko and Emperor Kōmei.
1853: A fleet of ships headed by Commodore Matthew Perry arrives in Japan on 8 July. Death of the shōgun Tokugawa Ieyoshi; appointment of Tokugawa Iesada as shōgun.
1854–55: Treaties are signed with the United States by the shogunate.
Late 1850s–1860s: The "Sonnō jōi" movement is in full force.
1858: The shogunate signs treaties with the Netherlands, Imperial Russia, and Great Britain. Death of the shōgun Tokugawa Iesada; appointment of Tokugawa Iemochi as shōgun.
March 1860: The Tairō, Ii Naosuke, is assassinated in the Sakuradamon incident.
11 November: Sachinomiya is formally proclaimed Crown Prince and given the personal name Mutsuhito.
1862: Namamugi Incident.
1864–65: Bombardment of Shimonoseki by British, American, French, and Dutch ships; fighting ensues between the shogunate and Chōshū.
1866: Death of the shōgun Tokugawa Iemochi; appointment of Tokugawa Yoshinobu as shōgun.
31 January 1867: Death of Emperor Kōmei from hemorrhagic smallpox, unofficial accession of Mutsuhito to the throne.
4 January 1868: Formal restoration of imperial rule; end of 265 years of rule by the Tokugawa shogunate.
12 September: Formal enthronement of the Emperor.
23 October: The era name is changed to Meiji.
6 November: The capital is moved from Kyoto Prefecture to Edo, renamed Tokyo.
5 November 1872: The Emperor receives the Grand Duke Alexei Alexandrovich of Russia.
Late 1860s–1881: Period of rebellion and assassination in Japan.
11 January 1869: Marriage of the Emperor to Ichijo Haruko, thenceforth the Empress Dowager Shōken.
4 September: The Emperor receives The Duke of Edinburgh.
1871: The abolition of the han system is proclaimed.
1873: Edo Castle is destroyed in a conflagration; the Emperor moves to the Akasaka Palace. His first children are born, but die at birth.
1877: The Satsuma Rebellion.
1878: Assassination of Ōkubo Toshimichi.
31 August 1879: Prince Yoshihito, the future Emperor Taishō and the Emperor's only surviving son, is born.
1881: Receives the first state visit of a foreign monarch, King Kalākaua of Hawaii.
1889: Meiji Constitution promulgated; Itō Hirobumi becomes first Prime Minister of Japan.
1894: Sino-Japanese War; Japanese victory establishes Japan as a regional power.
29 April 1901: Became grandfather when Emperor Taishō's first son, the Prince Hirohito Michi-no-miya, future Emperor Shōwa was born.
1904–1905: Russo-Japanese War; Japanese victory earns Japan the status of a great power.
1910: The Annexation of Korea by the Empire of Japan: Korea under Japanese rule (-1945).
30 July 1912: The Emperor dies (aged 59).

Gallery

Film depictions

Emperor Meiji is portrayed by Toshirō Mifune in the 1980 Japanese war drama film The Battle of Port Arthur (sometimes referred as 203 Kochi). Directed by Toshio Masuda, the film depicted the Siege of Port Arthur during the Russo-Japanese War, and also starred Tatsuya Nakadai (as General Nogi Maresuke), and Tetsurō Tamba (as General Kodama Gentarō).

Emperor Meiji also appears in the 2003 film The Last Samurai, played by Nakamura Shichinosuke II. In the film, the Emperor is portrayed as a weak, inexperienced leader under the firm control of his councilors, who intend to have him sign a treaty that would give the United States special trading rights that would enrich them, but also cement foreign domination of Japan. The Emperor's determination is only shown at the end of the movie, when he is inspired by a visit from Capt. Nathan Algren (played by Tom Cruise), who fought alongside the rebel samurai, to reject the treaty and dismiss his advisors, declaring that Japan will modernize, but not at the cost of its traditions and history.

Notes

References

Bibliography 

  /; OCLC 46731178
  /; /; OCLC 23869701

External links

  Meiji Shrine 
  Meiji Emperor
 
 
 

 
Meiji, Emperor of Japan
Emperor Meiji
1852 births
Meiji, Emperor of Japan

Emperor Meiji
People of the Boshin War
Emperor Meiji
Emperor Meiji
Emperor Meiji
People of Edo-period Japan
Emperor Meiji
Emperor Meiji
Emperor Meiji
Emperor Meiji
Emperor Meiji
Emperor Meiji
Recipients of the Order of the Golden Kite
Meiji, Emperor of Japan
Recipients of the Order of the Sacred Treasure
Meiji, Emperor of Japan
Meiji, Emperor of Japan
Meiji, Emperor of Japan
Grand Crosses of the Order of Saint Stephen of Hungary
3
3
3
Recipients of the Order of the Netherlands Lion
Grand Croix of the Légion d'honneur
19th-century Japanese monarchs
20th-century Japanese monarchs
Deified Japanese people